Beeron National Park is a national park at Beeron in the Wide Bay–Burnett region of Queensland, Australia.  The 7050-hectare park preserves plant species of high conservation value. It was formerly known as Beeron Holding or 'Rocky' paddock.

It is part of both the North Burnett Region and South Burnett Region local government areas and the Brigalow Belt bioregion.  The park lies within the catchment area of the Boyne River, a tributary of the Burnett River.

Beeron National Park is home to six endemic species and three plants with conservation significance.

In 2010, an extra 7,000 hectares significantly extended the size of the park.  The addition was made possible by the cooperation of two mining companies who relinquished their mining permits.

South and west of the national park is Allies Creek State Forest.  It is undeveloped with no visitor facilities.

See also

 Protected areas of Queensland

References

National parks of Queensland
Protected areas established in 2009
2009 establishments in Australia
Wide Bay–Burnett